Porphyromonas levii  is a Gram-negative, anaerobic bacterium from the genus  Porphyromonas, which has been isolated from a bovine rumen.

References 

Bacteroidia
Bacteria described in 1983